Frédérique Matla (born 28 December 1996) is a Dutch field hockey player.

Matla was part of the Netherlands Junior National Team at the 2016 Junior World Cup where the team finished second, and also finished as top scorer for the tournament, with 12 goals.

References

External links
 

living people
1996 births
Dutch female field hockey players
People from Huizen
Female field hockey forwards
HC Den Bosch players
Field hockey players at the 2020 Summer Olympics
Olympic field hockey players of the Netherlands
Olympic gold medalists for the Netherlands
Medalists at the 2020 Summer Olympics
Olympic medalists in field hockey
Sportspeople from North Holland
20th-century Dutch women
21st-century Dutch women